Statistics of National Association Foot Ball League in season 1896–97.

League standings
                          GP   W   L   T   Pts
 Bayonne Centreville
 Brooklyn Wanderers
 Kearny Scots
 Newark Caledonians

References
NATIONAL ASSOCIATION FOOT BALL LEAGUE (RSSSF)

1896-97
1896–97 domestic association football leagues
1896–97 in American soccer